Karasabai Airport  is an airport serving the Macushi community of Karasabai in the Upper Takutu-Upper Essequibo Region of Guyana.

See also

 List of airports in Guyana
 Transport in Guyana

References

External links
HERE/Nokia - Karasabai
Karasabai Airport
OurAirports - Karasabai

Airports in Guyana